Phyllonorycter triplex is a moth of the family Gracillariidae. It is known from Tamil Nadu, India.

Its subfamily are the Lithocolletinae.

References

triplex
Moths of Asia
Moths described in 1914